The watch wristlet waterproof was a type of watch manufactured in Switzerland and issued to British military forces after 1945. The (WWW) standard for wristwatches by the Ministry of Defence (United Kingdom) is believed to be one of the first official standards for a military issue watch.

Development
Timekeeping in disciplines such as navigation, and warfare have always been of vital importance. Mechanisms for telling things such as direction, star position, and time on boats date back to antiquity, but World War I was the first time that soldiers wore timepieces on their wrists in the form of trench watches. The obvious characteristics of a trench watch were that they were repurposed small sized (size 0, 7.5 Ligne, 29.62mm) pocket watches protected with crude metal used to protect the glass crystal covering the dial. The invention of the trench watch precipitated the invention of the wrist watch, and these watches were adopted by both the public and the military.

WWW standard
With the introduction of the wrist watch came British military issuance of a standard for military wrist watches; referred to as the WWW standard and characterized by a small, simple movement. Other requirements included a matte black dial with luminescent hands, numbers and indices, subsidiary seconds, a shatter-resistant perspex plastic crystal, a case resistant to water, dust and shock, a high-quality, isochronal and robust, 15 jewel movement, and a water-resistant winding crown of a good size.

Manufacturers
Twelve companies (Buren, Cyma, Eterna, Grana, IWC, Jaeger-LeCoultre, Lemania, Longines, Omega, Record, Timor, Vertex) responded with conforming designs for what are commonly called WWWs (watch(es), wristlet, waterproof), Mark X (after the IWC version), or colloquially 'the Dirty Dozen'. All featured the typical British military Broad arrow on both the dial and case back.

References

External links
 JLC Military WWW, Cal. 479
 W.W.W. - Watches Wristlet Waterproof
 British Horological Institute - Military Watch Information

Watches
Watch models